The Haploceratidae is the type family of the Haploceratoidea, a superfamily in the ammonitina; which according to Donovan et al. (1981) can be derived from the Taramelliceratinae, a subfamily of the Oppeliidae.

Haploceratids, (Haploceratidae) are typically small, smooth and somewhat featureless ammonites, as described by Arkell et al, without ribbing or ventral keels and moderately undifferentiated sutures; that range from the Late Kimmeridgian to the Hauterivian, crossing from the Jurassic into the Cretaceous.

References
Arkell et al., 1957 Mesozoic Ammonoidea, Treatise on Invertebrate Paleontology Part L. Geol Society of America and Univ Kansas Press R.C Moore (ed)

D.T Donavan, J.H. Callomon, and M.K Howarth. 1981.  Classification of the Jurassic Ammonitina. In The Ammonoidea. M.R. House and J.R. Senior, eds. Systematics Assoc.  Pub Academic Press.

Haploceratidae

Ammonitida families
Haploceratoidea
Kimmeridgian first appearances
Early Cretaceous extinctions